There are ten National Forest Parks in Cyprus:

Proposals for the Akamas National Forest Park are under government review during 2022.

References

External links 

 2018 United Nations List of Protected Areas of Cyprus

Lists of national parks
Cyprus geography-related lists
Lists of tourist attractions in Cyprus